Limoza Island is the rocky island off D'Urville Island in the Joinville Island group, Antarctica extending 470 m in west–east direction and 230 m wide.

The island is “named after the ocean fishing trawler Limoza of the Bulgarian company Ocean Fisheries – Burgas whose ships operated in the waters of South Georgia, Kerguelen, the South Orkney Islands, South Shetland Islands and Antarctic Peninsula from 1970 to the early 1990s.  The Bulgarian fishermen, along with those of the Soviet Union, Poland and East Germany are the pioneers of modern Antarctic fishing industry.”

Location
British mapping in 1973.

Maps
 Joinville Island. Scale 1:250000 topographic map SP 21-22/14. Directorate of Overseas Surveys, 1973.
 Antarctic Digital Database (ADD). Scale 1:250000 topographic map of Antarctica. Scientific Committee on Antarctic Research (SCAR). Since 1993, regularly upgraded and updated.

Notes

References
 Limoza Island. SCAR Composite Gazetteer of Antarctica.
 Bulgarian Antarctic Gazetteer. Antarctic Place-names Commission. (details in Bulgarian, basic data in English)

External links
 Limoza Island. Copernix satellite image

Islands of Graham Land
Joinville Island group
Ocean Fisheries – Burgas Co
Bulgaria and the Antarctic